National Memorial Cemetery of Arizona, also known as Arizona Veterans Memorial Cemetery, is a United States National Cemetery located in the city of Phoenix in Maricopa County, Arizona. It encompasses , and as of the end of 2005, had 43,672 interments. It is one of two national cemeteries in Arizona (the other is Prescott National Cemetery).

History
A state law passed in 1976, by then-Governor Raul Hector Castro, authorized the establishment of a large veterans' cemetery. The location in Phoenix was chosen and the cemetery was dedicated on December 9, 1978. The first interment took place the following spring. It was officially transferred to the control of the United States Department of Veterans Affairs and became a National Cemetery in 1989. In 1999, over 13 million dollars was spent on improving the facilities and developing the area with the intent of serving the burial needs of veterans until the year 2030.

Notable monuments
 Eternal Flame monument (shaped like a pyramid)
 World War II Submarine Torpedo Monument
 The Vietnam Veterans Memorial [Field Cross Memorial]

Notable interments

 Lee Aaker, actor
 Thomas Bonner, president of Union College and Wayne State University, author
 Nathan E. Cook, the last surviving veteran of the Spanish–American War, died at the age of 106
 Morris Courtright, Arizona state legislator
 Doyle "Porky" Lade, major league baseball player, for the Chicago Cubs
 Evan Mecham, former governor of Arizona
 Donnie Owens, singer, guitarist and music producer
 Henry Polic II, Vietnam War U.S. Army veteran and actor
 Eldon Rudd, former member of the United States House of Representatives from Arizona

See also
 Camp Navajo – site of another veterans' cemetery

Footnotes

External links
 National Memorial Cemetery of Arizona. United States Department of Veterans Affairs website.
 National Cemetery Administration
 
 

Cemeteries in Arizona
Burials in Arizona
Buildings and structures in Phoenix, Arizona
United States national cemeteries
Tourist attractions in Phoenix, Arizona
Protected areas of Maricopa County, Arizona
1978 establishments in Arizona